Palnackie is a village in the parish of Buittle in the historical county of Kirkcudbrightshire in Dumfries and Galloway, Scotland. It has a population of approximately 250 and is a working port on the Urr Water.

Palnackie is home to the Grande Internationale World Flounder Tramping Championships.

References 

Villages in Dumfries and Galloway